Susan Lewis is a fictional character from the television series ER.

Susan Lewis may also refer to:

Susan Lewis (writer) (born 1956), British author
Susan Lewis, Her Majesty's Chief Inspector of Education and Training in Wales, 2008 New Year Honours
Susan Williams (artist) (fl. 1963–2015), American artist, née Lewis